Pseudopostega conicula is a moth of the family Opostegidae. It known only from the Guanacaste Province in north-western Costa Rica in lowland, seasonal dry forests.

The length of the forewings is 2.3–2.6 mm. Adults are on wing in July and August.

Etymology
The specific name is derived from the Latin coniculus (meaning cone-like, conical) in reference to the conical elongation of the male gnathos.

External links
A Revision of the New World Plant-Mining Moths of the Family Opostegidae (Lepidoptera: Nepticuloidea)

Opostegidae
Moths described in 2007